West Conshohocken is a borough in Montgomery County, Pennsylvania, United States. The population was 1,320 at the 2010 census.

Its sister community is Conshohocken, located across the Schuylkill River. Montgomery County's seat, Norristown, is located approximately two miles north of, and on the opposite side of the river from, West Conshohocken.

History

West Conshohocken Borough was incorporated October 6, 1874 from land taken almost equally from the Townships of Lower and Upper Merion. As a river borough, there existed a large number of mills and other industries utilizing water power. The Dougherty Quarry was a prosperous business, producing stone of superior quality known as Conshohocken or Merion Blue. It was much sought after for public buildings, and was shipped by rail throughout the East before supplies were exhausted in the mid-twentieth century.
 
Today, with its proximity to highways I-76 and I-476 (Blue Route), this small borough and its sister Conshohocken Borough have experienced moderate office and retail development.  West Conshohocken is easily identified by the mid and high-rise commercial development along its waterfront, which in recent years has also spread across the river to Conshohocken's waterfront.

Geography
West Conshohocken is located at  (40.069509, -75.315755).

Climate
The climate in this area is characterized by hot, humid summers and generally mild to cool winters.  According to the Köppen Climate Classification system, West Conshohocken has a humid subtropical climate, abbreviated "Cfa" on climate maps. Average monthly temperatures range from 32.1° F in January to 76.6° F in July.  The local hardiness zone is 7a.

Demographics

As of the 2010 census, the borough was 90.1% White, 3.6% Black or African American, 0.5% Native American, 3.3% Asian, and 1.7% were two or more races. 3.6% of the population were of Hispanic or Latino ancestry 

At the 2000 census there were 1,446 people, 600 households, and 342 families residing in the borough. The population density was 1,701.4 people per square mile (656.8/km2). There were 633 housing units at an average density of 744.8 per square mile (287.5/km2).  The racial makeup of the borough was 93.91% White, 2.84% African American, 0.07% Native American, 1.80% Asian, 0.07% Pacific Islander, 0.21% from other races, and 1.11% from two or more races. Hispanic or Latino of any race were 1.04%.

There were 600 households, 17.5% had children under the age of 18 living with them, 41.7% were married couples living together, 11.5% had a female householder with no husband present, and 43.0% were non-families. 29.0% of households were made up of individuals, and 6.7% were one person aged 65 or older. The average household size was 2.40 and the average family size was 3.01.

In the borough the population was spread out, with 17.6% under the age of 18, 12.6% from 18 to 24, 35.2% from 25 to 44, 22.2% from 45 to 64, and 12.4% 65 or older. The median age was 35 years. For every 100 females there were 102.0 males. For every 100 females age 18 and over, there were 105.0 males.

The median household income was $56,111 and the median family income  was $62,708. Males had a median income of $40,833 versus $31,696 for females. The per capita income for the borough was $30,627. About 3.5% of families and 7.3% of the population were below the poverty line, including 8.1% of those under age 18 and 2.7% of those age 65 or over.

Politics and government

West Conshohocken has a city manager form of government with a mayor and a seven-member borough council.

The borough is part of the Fourth Congressional District (represented by Rep. Madeleine Dean), the 149th State House District (represented by Rep. Tim Briggs) and the 17th State Senate District (represented by Sen. Amanda Cappelletti).

Public water is provided by Aqua of PA. Sewer facilities were sold in June 2017 to the Borough of Conshohocken for around $9,500,500.00 (9.5 million) West Conshohocken sewers are now owned and managed by the Conshohocken Authority, and all payments go to Conshohocken. Residential trash pickup is still provided by West Conshohocken. A full-time police force serves the community, but fire protection is provided by a volunteer company, the George Clay Steam Fire Engine and Hose Company Number 1, Station 39. SEPTA bus lines provide access to the Norristown Transportation Center, and bus and rail lines connect the borough to other portions of Montgomery County and Philadelphia.

Transportation

West Conshohocken is the location of one of the major highway junctions of the Philadelphia metropolitan area, that being the interchange of the Schuylkill Expressway (Interstate 76) and "Blue Route" (Interstate 476). Pennsylvania Route 23 also traverses the borough, providing local access.

SEPTA provides Suburban Bus service to West Conshohocken along Route 95, which runs between Gulph Mills and Willow Grove. The Conshohocken station serving SEPTA Regional Rail's Manayunk/Norristown Line is located across the Schuylkill River in Conshohocken.

Education
West Conshohocken pupils are assigned to schools in the Upper Merion Area School District. Residents have access to the Conshohocken Free Library.

Healthcare
The area is served by two hospitals, Einstein Medical Center Montgomery and Suburban Community Hospital.

Companies and organizations
 ASTM International
 Collectables Records and Alpha Video
 Connelly Foundation
 Cheswold Lane Asset Management

References

External links

 Borough of West Conshohocken
 George Clay Steam Fire Engine and Hose Company, Station 39
 Montgomery County Pennsylvania website
 Pictorial History of the Conshohockens
 News/Gossip of West Conshohocken/Conshohocken

Populated places established in 1874
Boroughs in Montgomery County, Pennsylvania
1874 establishments in Pennsylvania